The A Black Diamond District is a high school conference of the Virginia High School League which draws its members from the western part of Southwest Virginia. The schools in the Black Diamond District compete in A Region D with the schools of the A Cumberland District, and the A Lonesome Pine District. The district gets its name from the "black diamond," a nickname for the coal whose mining formed the backbone of the region's economy until the 1980s.

Haysi and Honaker have a larger enrollment than the other schools in the district, sometimes leading to disparities, mostly in football. This is aggravated by Council choosing not to field a football team due to the schools small size and inability to produce enough athletes (typical Council football teams consisted of 15-20 players). 
In Scholastic Bowl, Honaker has been the dominant force, winning either the district regular season and/or district tournament for 12 consecutive years. While Haysi has traditionally been the dominant team in the sports arena winning nearly all of the boys track titles and a majority of the districts football titles.

However, all members have proven competitive in basketball and other activities, with Council, Hurley, and Twin Valley all making deep runs into the playoffs during the past 10 years. Twin Valley is the "newest" member, resulting from Buchanan County's decision to consolidate Garden and Whitewood High Schools in 2001.

Member schools
Council High School of Council, Virginia
Grundy Senior High School
Honaker High School of Honaker, Virginia
Hurley High School of Hurley, Virginia
Twin Valley High School of Pilgrims Knob, Virginia

Virginia High School League